Merrill Beyeler is an American cattle farmer, former politician and former educator from Idaho. Beyeler was a Republican member of Idaho House of Representatives.

Education 
Beyeler earned a Bachelor of Arts degree in Education from Boise State University.

Career 
Beyeler is a former teacher.

Beyeler is a cattle farmer in Idaho.

On November 4. 2014, Beyeler won the election and became a Republican member of Idaho House of Representatives for District 8, seat B. Beyeler defeated Jocelyn Francis Plass and Mike Barrett with 66.3% of the votes.

Awards 
 2013 Rangeland Stewardship Award. Bureau of Land Management.
 2013 Pacific States Marine Fisheries Commission Annual Award.
 Lemhi Cattlemen and Horse Growers Association Rancher of the Year.

Personal life 
Beyeler's wife is Sharal Beyeler. They have five children. Beyeler and his family live in Leadore, Idaho.

References

External links 
 Merrill Beyeler at ballotpedia.org
 Merrill Beyeler at lemhilandtrust.org
 Merrill Beyeler at thestlantic.com

Boise State University alumni
Farmers from Idaho
Living people
Republican Party members of the Idaho House of Representatives
People from Lemhi County, Idaho
Year of birth missing (living people)